Carpentersville is an unincorporated community located in Pohatcong Township in Warren County, New Jersey.

Pohatcong Creek flows into the Delaware River south of Carpentersville.

History
The settlement is named for Jacob Carpenter, a Swiss immigrant who settled here in 1748. Roper's Ferry operated across the Delaware River as early as 1769. 

The Belvidere-Delaware Railroad reached Carpentersville in 1854 and built a station in the area. The passenger stop remained in commercial operation until 1952. The railroad line is still in operation today at the hamlet owned by the newer 1995 company Belvidere and Delaware River Railway. By 1882, Carpentersville had saw and grist mills, a post office, and ten lime kilns.

Delaware River Drive, a New Jersey state highway which existed from 1911 to 1916, passed through Carpentersville.

References

Pohatcong Township, New Jersey
Unincorporated communities in Warren County, New Jersey